The silver-eared honeyeater (Lichmera alboauricularis) is a species of bird in the family Meliphagidae.
It is found in New Guinea.
Its natural habitat is subtropical or tropical mangrove forests.

Description 
The Silver-eared honeyeater is a sparrow-sized honeyeater with a downcurved bill, a prominent white ear mark, plain brown upperparts, and pale underparts with distinct dark mottling on the breast. Inhabits open coastal areas with canegrass and scattered trees, and also mangroves and coconut plantations. Generally occurs within vegetation close to watercourses. Combination of streaked chest, pale ear patch, and plain brown upperparts separate it from all other New Guinea honeyeaters. Vocalizations include harsh chattering and nasal “weet-weet-weet” calls, as well as a sharp “jit” note.

References

silver-eared honeyeater
Birds of New Guinea
silver-eared honeyeater
Taxonomy articles created by Polbot